Mazraeh Now or Mazraeh-ye Now or Mazraeh Nau or Mazaraeh Nau may refer to:
 Mazraeh-ye Now, Fars
 Mazraeh-ye Now, Sistan, Isfahan County, Isfahan Province
 Mazraeh Now, Ashtian, Markazi Province
 Mazraeh-ye Now, Khomeyn, Markazi Province
 Mazraeh-ye Now, Mehriz, Yazd Province
 Mazraeh Now Rural District, in Markazi Province